Valjeviken is a village situated in Sölvesborg Municipality, Blekinge County, Sweden with 211 inhabitants in 2005.

References 

Populated places in Sölvesborg Municipality